Robert Geoffrey Anderson (29 March 1939 – 3 May 2020) was a New Zealand cricketer. He played 16 first-class matches for Otago between 1961 and 1965.

A right-arm fast-medium bowler, Anderson was a regular member of the Otago team for three seasons, usually opening the bowling with Frank Cameron. He took three wickets in an innings several times, with best figures of 3 for 29 in his last match, against Canterbury in 1964–65. He was also a useful tail-end batsman, who made his highest first-class score in 1961/62 when, batting at number 10, he top-scored for Otago with 48 against Central Districts in the 1961-62 Plunket Shield.

Anderson was educated at Otago Boys' High School between 1953 and 1955 and was Otago snooker champion in 1961. He died at Christchurch Hospital on 3 May 2020.

References

1939 births
2020 deaths
New Zealand cricketers
Otago cricketers
Cricketers from Dunedin
People educated at Otago Boys' High School